Air France Flight 422 was a scheduled flight on 20 April 1998 by Air France from Bogotá, Colombia, to Quito, Ecuador, covering the final leg of a flight from Paris to Bogotá, operated by TAME on behalf of Air France. The Boeing 727 was destroyed, killing all 53 people on board, when it crashed into the Eastern Hills of Bogotá because of foggy weather and low visibility after taking off from Bogotá's El Dorado International Airport. The plane was owned by TAME, the Ecuadorian airline, but was being operated on a wet-lease basis to Air France as the final leg of its flight from Paris.

Summary 
The TAME Boeing 727-200Adv was covering the final leg of an Air France flight, with Ecuadorian crew. The 3-man flight deck crew was acceptably skilled, according to training authorities, but the flight's captain had logged only about 400 hours in the 727. A flight operations mechanic and 6 flight attendants completed the crew. Forty-three passengers were among the 53 people on board the aircraft.

Accident 
The aircraft was cleared to Quito International Airport via the Girardot 1 (GIR1) departure, which consisted of a right turn after takeoff (over the Romeo/R NDB) for noise abatement, and subsequent transitioning (via VIOTA) to a south-west route. The flight crew failed to execute the maneuver properly; the first officer, acting as pilot flying, did not make the initial turn, and then forgot to turn the transponder on, which prohibited radar controllers from assisting them. Investigators concluded that the acceleration toward 260 knots resulted in loss of situational awareness by the crew, with the single-minded focus on gaining airspeed leading to disregard of safe navigation of the aircraft.

Less than 2 minutes after taking off from the runway 13L, the aircraft crashed at an airspeed of 260 knots into the Cerro el Cable, while passing . All 53 people on board died due to a combination of impact and fire injuries. The fire also consumed a  forest area, which was burnt after the aircraft disintegrated and exploded upon impact.

References

External links

Final report (in Spanish) (Archive)
Final report(Archive) 
 , Aerocivil 
Aftermath of the crash from Associated Press Archive

Air France 422
Aviation accidents and incidents in Colombia
Aviation accidents and incidents in 1998
Aviation accidents and incidents involving controlled flight into terrain
1998 in Colombia
422
April 1998 events in South America
Airliner accidents and incidents caused by pilot error
Airliner accidents and incidents caused by weather